Paul Scott may refer to:
Paul Scott (novelist) (1920–1978), English novelist, playwright, and poet
Paul H. Scott (born 1982), American politician from Michigan
Paul Scott (comics), English comic book writer
Paul Scott (cricketer) (born 1962), English cricketer
Paul Scott (footballer, born 1979), English football player for Huddersfield, Bury and Morecambe
Paul Scott (footballer, born 1985), English football player for Burnley
Paul B Scott (born 1975), Jamaican businessman, investor and philanthropist
Paul Scott (poet), British poet
Paul Scott (rugby union), South African rugby union player
Paul Scott (politician), American state senator from Oklahoma
Paul Scott (decathlete) (born 1970), Australian decathlete and competitor at the 1991 World Championships

See also